Bob Kabonero is a businessman and entrepreneur in Uganda. According to a 2012 published report, he was one of the wealthiest people in Uganda.

Background and education
He was born in Uganda circa 1965, and is the youngest of the family's three children. The eldest, Susan Muhwezi, is the wife of Ugandan Security Minister Jim Muhwezi. His older brother is Richard Kabonero, Uganda's ambassador to Tanzania. Bob Kabonero received a Bachelor of Arts in business administration and retail management from Oxford Brookes University in Oxford, England. He is a father of two, Asiimwe Kabonero and Aijuka Kabonero

Businesses and investments
Bob Kabonero is the Chairman Board of Governors of Vienna College Among his business interests are the Kampala Casino and the Pyramids Casino. He also owns a logistics company, an import goods business, and the Europcar franchise in Uganda. Kabonero is the chairman of Park Hospitality Limited, the owners of the proposed Kampala Radisson Blue Hotel, which is being developed in partnership with the Carlson Rezidor Hotel Group.

Net worth
According to the New Vision newspaper, Kabonero had a net worth of about US$50 million in 2012.

See also
 List of wealthiest people in Uganda

References

External links
Radisson Blu planned for Ugandan capital

Living people
1965 births
Ankole people
People from Ntungamo District
Ntungamo District
Ugandan businesspeople
People from Western Region, Uganda
Alumni of Oxford Brookes University
Ugandan businesspeople in real estate
Businesspeople in the hospitality industry